The Teatro Nacional de Venezuela is a building (opened 1905) and associated theatre company in Caracas. The theatre presents plays, operas and zarzuelas.

References

External links
Teatro Nacional de Venezuela on teatroccs.org.ve 

Monuments and memorials in Venezuela
Venezuela
Opera houses in Venezuela
Theatres completed in 1905
Theatres in Caracas
Tourist attractions in Caracas
1905 establishments in Venezuela